Cabyle or Kabile, also known as Calybe or Kabile (Καλύβη), is a town in the interior of ancient Thrace, west of Develtus, on the river Tonsus. The town later bore the names of Diospolis (Διὸς Πόλις), and Goloë (Γολόη).

History 
Cabyle used to be one of the most important centers of south-eastern Thrace. It was established around 2000 BC on the Zaychi Vrah Heights. 

In 341 BC Cabyle was conquered by the army of Philip II of Macedon and was later included in the Empire of Alexander of Macedon. It was colonised by Philip with rebellious Macedonians. In the 3rd century BC it was governed again by the Thracians. The town was a major trade and military center between the 3rd and the 2nd centuries BC. The town is noted by numerous ancient authors including Demosthenes, Polybius, Strabo, Pliny the Elder, and Stephanus of Byzantium.

In 71 BC the city was conquered by the Roman Republic by the troops of Marcus Lucullus and after 45 BC it was included in the Roman client state of the Sapaean Thracian kingdom, and after 46 AD in the province of Thracia. Cabyle was one of the most important cities of Thrace following the reforms of Emperor Diocletian in 4th century AD.

In late 4th century Cabyle was seized by the Goths. It was finally destroyed by the Avars and never settled again. During the Middle Ages there was a small settlement located in the territory of the ancient city.

Archaeology
It was proclaimed part of the 100 Tourist Sites of Bulgaria. The territory of the city and the surrounding area was proclaimed a territory of national importance in 1965 and converted to an archaeological reserve. The area of the reserve is around 65 km2.

Many of the findings are housed in the onsite museum which also includes an exhibition tracking the excavation history of the site.

Titular see 
Under the name of Diospolis in Thracia, it remains a titular see of the Roman Catholic Church.

References

Populated places in ancient Thrace
Thracian sites
Argead colonies
Roman towns and cities in Bulgaria
Geography of Yambol Province
Former populated places in Bulgaria
Protected areas of Bulgaria
Tourist attractions in Yambol Province
Buildings and structures in Yambol Province
Greek colonies in Thrace
History of Yambol Province
Archaeological sites in Bulgaria
Museums in Bulgaria
Destroyed cities